Connect (stylized as CONNECT, powered by American Family Insurance) is an insurance company located in De Pere, Wisconsin. Connect provides auto, home, condo, renters, umbrella (personal liability) and specialty products (through an in-house agency). Insurance is underwritten by American Family Connect Property and Casualty Insurance Company (formerly IDS Property Casualty Insurance Company) and American Family Connect Insurance Company (formerly Ameriprise Insurance Company), each a wholly owned subsidiary of American Family Insurance Mutual Holding Company. They also partner with various specialty insurance providers to offer coverage for items such as watercraft, ATVs, recreational vehicles and motorcycles. Connect is an affinity marketer, relying almost entirely on strategic partnerships to reach customers. Partners include Costco Wholesale, and Ameriprise Financial. In 2018, Ameriprise Auto & Home Insurance generated more than $1.1 billion in annual written premium.

History 
American Express Company acquired IDS in 1984 and renamed it American Express Financial Corporation. They acquired Wisconsin Employers Casualty Company of Green Bay in 1986, renamed it IDS Property Casualty Insurance Company, and relaunched it the following year with 25 employees. In 2019, Ameriprise Auto & Home Insurance was acquired by American Family Insurance. In 2020, it was renamed CONNECT, powered by American Family Insurance in 2020.

Timeline 

1986 – American Express Financial Corporation acquired Wisconsin Employers Casualty Company of Green Bay and renamed it IDS Property Casualty Insurance Company.

1987 – IDS Property Casualty Insurance Company begins selling auto, home and personal liability umbrella insurance in Wisconsin.

1988 – The company expands its coverage area to include Minnesota, Indiana, Iowa and Ohio.

1999 – The company is actively selling insurance products in 35 states.

2000 – The company moves to a new headquarters in De Pere, Wisconsin.

2005 – Ameriprise Financial, Inc., becomes an independent, publicly owned company. IDS Property Casualty Insurance Company begins doing business as Ameriprise Auto & Home Insurance. IDS Property Casualty Insurance Company remains the underwriting company, paired with the newly developed underwriting company Ameriprise Insurance Company. That same year, the company also opened its second office in Phoenix, Arizona. 

2012 – Ameriprise Auto & Home Insurance opens a third location in Las Vegas, Nevada.

2019 – On October 1, 2019, American Family Insurance closed on the purchase of IDS Property Casualty Insurance Company from Ameriprise Financial.

2020 – CONNECT, powered by American Family Insurance debuts. The company has more than 2,000 employees and offers insurance products in 43 states.

Awards and certifications 

"A" (Excellent) Rating for Financial Strength, Stability and Soundness of Operating Performance - A.M. Best (the leading independent rater of insurers in the country)
Consistently on the Ward Group's Ward's Top 50 list (top performing property and casualty companies)

References

External links 
Connect, powered by American Family Insurance

Insurance companies of the United States
American companies established in 1986
Financial services companies established in 1986
Companies based in Green Bay, Wisconsin
1986 establishments in Wisconsin
2019 mergers and acquisitions